Balkanites is a genus of extinct ammonites (s.l.), belonging to the ceratitid superfamily Ceratitacea and family Tirolitidae. It is restricted to the Triassic period. As common to the family, the shell is evolute with lateral tubercles. The suture is not elaborate.

References 

 Arkel et al., Mesozoic Ammonoidea; Treatise on Invertebrate Paleontology, Part L, Ammonoidea. Geological Society of America & University of Kansas Press; R. C. Moore (ed) 
 Balkinites -PaleoDB

Ceratitoidea
Ceratitida genera
Triassic ammonites
Ammonites of Europe